The Girl Who Ate Herself is the debut album by American-born singer-songwriter Betsy Cook. It was released in 1992 by EastWest Records.

Background
Prior to the release of the album, Cook was a songwriter, session musician, and backing vocalist for other artists, and had worked with Paul Young, George Michael, Marc Almond, Frankie Goes to Hollywood, Seal and Gerry Rafferty. Cook had actually started recording her own material as early as 1984, when she recorded and co-produced versions of her songs "Nothing Ventured" and "Wonderland" with her then-husband Hugh Murphy (who had been Gerry Rafferty's producer). "Wonderland" was then recorded by Paul Young in 1986, with Cook on backing vocals, and became a Top 30 hit. Cook was eventually offered a recording deal of her own, and she recorded several more tracks and also re-recorded elements of the two songs that she had originally recorded with her husband in the mid-1980s.

Although the album (and its singles) failed to make any commercial impact, the material gained enough prominence to be covered by more established artists in later years. "Docklands" was recorded by Stevie Nicks for her 1994 album Street Angel. The track "Love Is the Groove" was recorded by Cher for her 1998 album Believe. 

The album's cover portrait was taken by Cook herself, with inner portraits taken by photographer Kate Garner (former singer with the band Haysi Fantayzee).

Following the album's release, Cook did not release any further recordings of her own but continued to work with producers Horn, Lipson, and Woolley as a writer and session musician on other projects.

Track listing
 "Love Is the Groove" (Betsy Cook, Bruce Woolley)
 "How Can I Believe?" (Betsy Cook, Clyde Lieberman)
 "Docklands" (Betsy Cook, Trevor Horn)
 "Exchange Some Energy" (Betsy Cook)
 "Look to Yourself" (Betsy Cook, Bruce Wooley)
 "Wonderland" (Betsy Cook)
 "Hold Me Tight" (Betsy Cook)
 "Nothing Ventured" (Betsy Cook)
 "Diving" (Betsy Cook, Jonathan Nash)
 "Hand On My Shoulder" (Betsy Cook)
 "Love Is the Groove" (reprise)

Singles
"Love Is the Groove" (1991)
"How Can I Believe?" (1992)
"Docklands" (1992)

Personnel
All tracks arranged and performed by Betsy Cook, with:
Stephen Lipson - guitars (tracks 1,2,8), drums (1,2)
Bruce Woolley - drums (1), harmonics (1), backing vocals (1), guitar (5)
Luís Jardim - percussion (2)
Tony Phillips - drums (1)
Wil Malone - string arrange ments (2), piano and idiosyncrasies (4), "interesting noises" (1)
Gavin Wright - strings leader (2)
Dave Defries - trumpet (4)
Felix Kirsh - bass (5)
Andy Duncan - drums (5)
Richard Brunton - guitar (6)
Stuart Elliot - drums (6 8)
Nico Ramsdem - guitar (7)
Mark Smith - percussion (7)
Jonathan Nash - piano (9)
Ian Stanley - drums and "vibey vibes" (10)

Mixed by Stephen Lipson (2,4), Tony Phillips (1,3), Ren Swan (1), Paul Gomershall (5,6,7), Ross Cullum (10)

References

1992 debut albums
Albums produced by Stephen Lipson
Albums produced by Trevor Horn
Albums produced by Ian Stanley
East West Records albums